Alex Bogomolov Jr. was the defending champion but decided not to participate.
Alex Kuznetsov won the title, defeating Rik De Voest 6–1, 6–3 in the final.

Seeds

Draw

Finals

Top half

Bottom half

References
 Main Draw
 Qualifying Draw

JSM Challenger of Champaign-Urbana - Singles
JSM Challenger of Champaign–Urbana